56th Street station is an elevated subway station on SEPTA's Market–Frankford Line, located at the intersection of 56th and Market Street in Philadelphia, Pennsylvania. The station serves two West Philadelphia neighborhoods, Haddington to the north, and Cobbs Creek to the south.

The station is also served by SEPTA bus routes 31 and G.

History

From May 31, 2005 to February 2006, the station underwent a rehabilitation project as part of a multi-phase reconstruction of the entire western Market Street Elevated. The renovated station included new elevators, escalators, lighting, and other infrastructure, as well as a new brick station house. The project resulted in the station becoming compliant with the Americans with Disabilities Act.

Station layout
There are two side platforms connecting to a station house on the southwest corner of 56th and Market streets. There are also two exit-only stairs descending to the east side of 56th Street.

References

External links

Station house from Google Maps Street View
Images from NYCSubway.org

SEPTA Market-Frankford Line stations
Railway stations in Philadelphia
Railway stations in the United States opened in 1907
1907 establishments in Pennsylvania